Lophocera flavipuncta is a species of snout moth in the genus Lophocera. It was described by George Hamilton Kenrick in 1917 and is known from Madagascar.

This species has a wingspan of 30–34 mm.

References

Moths described in 1917
Pyralinae
Moths of Madagascar
Moths of Africa
Taxa named by George Hamilton Kenrick